= Aoife Doyle (musician) =

Irish musician, singer/songwriter

Aoife Doyle is a singer, musician and songwriter from Wicklow, Ireland. She has released three albums, This Time The Dream's On Me (2013), Clouds (2017) and Infinitely Clear (2022).
